The 1992 Coppa Italia Final was the final of the 1991–92 Coppa Italia, the 45th season of the top cup competition in Italian football. The match was played over two legs on 7 May and 14 May 1992 between Juventus and Parma. The final was won by Parma, who claimed their first Coppa Italia title with a 2–1 aggregate victory.

First leg

Second leg

References
Coppa Italia 1991/92 statistics at rsssf.com

Coppa Italia Finals
Coppa Italia Final 1992
Coppa Italia Final 1992